Senegambia and Niger was a short-lived administrative unit of the French possessions in Africa, formed in 1902 and reorganized in 1904 into Upper Senegal and Niger.

Despite its brief existence, the French government-issued postage stamps for the administrative unit, in the form of a version of its Navigation and Commerce series, inscribed "SENEGAMBIE / ET NIGER". The set consisted of 13 values, from 1 centime to 1 franc.

See also
Postage stamps and postal history of French Sudan
Postage stamps and postal history of The Gambia
Postage stamps and postal history of Upper Senegal and Niger

References 

Philately by country
French West Africa